In music, Op. 141 stands for Opus number 141. Compositions that are assigned this number include:

 Schumann – 4 doppelchörige Gesänge (partsongs)
 Shostakovich – Symphony No. 15
 Strauss II – Wellen und Wogen